Pestszentlőrinc-Elektromos-Rév Kézilabda Club was a Hungarian team handball club from Pestszentlőrinc, Budapest, that played in the  Nemzeti Bajnokság I, the top level championship in Hungary.

Crest, colours, supporters

Naming history

Kits

Sports Hall information
Name: – Pestszentimrei Sportkastély
City: – Budapest, XVIII. ker
Capacity: – 1100
Address: – 1188 Budapest Kisfaludy utca, 33/c

Current squad
Squad for the 2021–22 season

Transfers
Transfers for the 2021–22 season

Joining 
  Attila Tóth (RB) from  Veszprém KKFT Felsőörs
  Benedek Szakály (RW) from  Veszprém KKFT Felsőörs
  András Schekk (LB) from  Tatai AC
  Dávid Foki (CB) from  NEKA
  Balázs Márton (LB) from  KK Ajka

Leaving 
  Dániel Takó (RB) to  Orosházi FKSE
  Sándor Bak (CB)

Previous Squads

Honours

Recent seasons
Seasons in Nemzeti Bajnokság I: 17
Seasons in Nemzeti Bajnokság I/B: 13
Seasons in Nemzeti Bajnokság II: 4

Former club members

Notable former players

 György Bakos
 Mohamed Yassine Benmiloud
 Sándor Bohács
 Bendegúz Bujdosó
 Gábor Grebenár
 László Kemény
 András Koncz
 Szabolcs Laurencz
 Csaba Leimeter
 Péter Lendvay
 Bence Nagy 
 Máté Nagy
 Gábor Pálos
 Márton Székely 
 Ádám Tóth
  Mihály Tóth
 Alencar Cassiano Rossoni
 Mohsen Babasafari
 Alireza Mousavi 
 Martin Mazak
 Jakub Mikita
 Matej Mikita
 Teodor Paul
 Tomáš Szűcs
 Gabriel Vadkerti
 Milan Kuzman
 Darko Pavlović
 Bojan Rađenović

References

External links
 Official Website
 

Hungarian handball clubs
Sport in Budapest
Handball clubs established in 1927
1927 establishments in Hungary